Lila Azam Zanganeh is a writer raised in Paris, France, by exiled Iranian parents. She lives and works in New York City. She is the author of The Enchanter: Nabokov and Happiness (Penguin Books, 2011). She was a member of the jury for the 2017 Man Booker Prize for fiction. She has just published a long-form essay in Lolita in the Afterlife (Vintage Books, 2021). Her new novel, Of Lovers and Other Madmen, is forthcoming in 2022.

Life and work
Azam Zanganeh was born to Iranian exile parents, and the family escaped to Paris when Zanganeh was two years old, following the revolution of 1979. After studying literature and philosophy at the École Normale Supérieure, she moved to the United States to become a teaching fellow in literature, cinema, and Romance languages at Harvard University. In 2002, she began contributing literary articles, interviews, and essays to a host of American and European publications, among which The New York Times, The Paris Review, Le Monde, and la Repubblica.

Her first book, The Enchanter: Nabokov and Happiness, has been published by W. W. Norton & Company in the United States, Penguin Books in the United Kingdom, Éditions de l'Olivier in France, Contact in Holland, L'Ancora del Mediterraneo in Italy, Duomo Ediciones in Spain, Azbooka in Russia, Büchergilde Gutenberg in Germany, Everest in Turkey, Shang Shu in China, Al-Kamel in Lebanon, Mehri Publications in Iran, and Alfaguara Objetiva in Brazil, where it reached No. 10 on the national Brazilian bestseller list.

She is fluent in seven languages (English, French, Persian, Spanish, Italian, Russian, and Portuguese). She writes and lives in New York City. Her new novel, Of Lovers and Other Madmen, is forthcoming in 2022.

Social initiatives
 Azam Zanganeh served on the Board of Overseers of the International Rescue Committee for 12 years. 
 Azam Zanganeh was a member of the advisory board of The Lunchbox Fund, a non-profit organization that delivers a daily meal to pupils in township schools in Soweto, South Africa, until the end of 2011.
 She is a global ambassador for Libraries Without Borders as well as a board member of Narrative4, an international story-exchange organization that promotes radical empathy.

Works and Publications
 The Enchanter: Nabokov and Happiness (2011). O encantador: Nabokov e a felicidade (Portuguese Brazilian Edition) 
 My Sister, Guard Your Veil, My Brother, Guard Your Eyes: Uncensored Iranian Voices (2006) (edited by Lila Azam Zanganeh). 
 	Modern Classics Paris by Julien Green, Lila Azam Zanganeh (co-author) 
 	Where You Are: A Collection of Maps That Will Leave You Feeling Completely Lost Lila Azam Zanganeh (contributing author) 
  	L'estate la sentivo arrivare dal viale, Lila Azam Zanganeh (interviewer)

Awards and recognition
 The Enchanter is the recipient of the Roger Shattuck Prize for Criticism, awarded each year by the Center for Fiction, 2011. 
 Recognized by The Man Booker Prize which named her as a judge for the 2017 PEN/NABOKOV AWARD FOR ACHIEVEMENT IN INTERNATIONAL LITERATURE section. She served on a panel of five judges, chaired by Baroness Lola Young.

References

External links

"Ecstasy on 3 x 5 Cards: Lila Azam Zanganeh's Nabokov", interview on Radio Open Source with Christopher Lydon, June 1, 2011.
Lila Azam Zanganeh on the portal RAI Letteratura
 Lila Azam Zanganeh at the Berlin International Literature Festival 2013

ENS Fontenay-Saint-Cloud-Lyon alumni
Living people
Iranian writers
French women writers
French people of Iranian descent
French emigrants to the United States
Writers from Paris
The New York Times people
Year of birth missing (living people)